Njongonkulu Winston Hugh Ndungane (born 2 April 1941) is a retired South African Anglican bishop and a former prisoner on Robben Island.  He was the Bishop of Kimberley and Kuruman and Archbishop of Cape Town.

Early life 

Ndungane was born in Kokstad. He attended Lovedale High School, Alice, Eastern Cape and completed his schooling there in December 1958.

Political life and imprisonment 

In March 1960 he was involved in anti-Pass Law demonstrations while a student at the University of Cape Town and was later arrested for his anti-apartheid activities. From August 1963 he served a three-year sentence on Robben Island as a political prisoner. On his release he was served with a two-year banning order.

Church ministry 

Ndungane decided to seek ordination during his imprisonment on Robben Island. In 1971 the Most Reverend Robert Selby Taylor, Archbishop of Cape Town, sent him to St Peter’s College, Alice, Eastern Cape. He was ordained a deacon in December 1973 and a priest in July 1974. He served his first curacy in Athlone, Cape Town in the Diocese of Cape Town. In 1975 he left South Africa for King's College London, where he earned his Bachelor of Divinity and Master of Theology degrees while he was a curate in London.

After his time in London he had a short time as an assistant chaplain at St George’s Church in Paris.  He returned to South Africa in 1980 and was appointed the rector of St Nicholas' Matroosfontein. Phillip Russell, archbishop of Cape Town, appointed him as his representative in the Diocese of Johannesburg

In 1984 he was mandated by Archbishop Russell to take responsibility for reopening St Bede’s Theological College, Umtata, which had been closed. In 1985 he was appointed principal of St Bede’s.

In 1991 he was elected Bishop of Kimberley and Kuruman. In September 1996 he was elected archbishop of Cape Town and Metropolitan of the Anglican Church of Southern Africa.

In 2006, he founded African Monitor, a pan-African non-profit organization that monitors both the fulfillment of the promises of both aid-giving and aid-receiving countries.

Awards 

 Order of the Baobab in Silver (2008)
 Doctor of Divinity (honoris causa) Rhodes University
 Freedom of the City of Cape Town (2016)

Publications

References

Further reading 

 
 

1941 births
Living people
People from Kokstad
Xhosa people
Anglican archbishops of Cape Town
Anglican bishops of Kimberley and Kuruman
20th-century Anglican Church of Southern Africa bishops
Anglican anti-apartheid activists
21st-century Anglican archbishops
Alumni of King's College London
Associates of King's College London
Fellows of King's College London
Order of the Baobab
Inmates of Robben Island